Patsey (ca. 1830–after 1863) was an African-American enslaved woman. Solomon Northup wrote about her in his book Twelve Years a Slave, which is the source for most of the information known about her. There have been two adaptations of the book in film, Solomon Northup's Odyssey in 1984 and the better known 12 Years a Slave, in 2013.  In the latter Patsey was portrayed by Lupita Nyong'o, who won the Academy Award for Best Supporting Actress for her performance.

Life
Patsey's mother was said to have been from Guinea, enslaved and taken to Cuba. She was then sold to a family named Buford in the Southern United States. Patsey is believed to have been born around 1830, in South Carolina.

In 1843, when she was 13, she was sold to Edwin Epps in Louisiana. According to Northup, Edwin Epps had "repulsive and coarse" manners and did not have a sense "of kindness or of justice." When drunk, he would lash out at enslaved people with a whip, enjoying the sound of their screams.

Epps leased the Bayou Huffpower plantation from Joseph B. Robert, his wife's uncle. In 1845, Epps moved Patsey and other enslaved people to his 300-acre plantation near Bunkie in Avoyelles Parish, Louisiana. Solomon Northup and Patsey became friends on the Epps plantation. Known as the "queen of the fields", Patsey was often praised by her owner for her ability to pick large amounts of cotton, up to 500 pounds a day. Northup said that she was unlike the other slaves and had a spirit that was unwavering in its strength. She had been "a joyous creature, a laughing, light-hearted girl" who fervently dreamed of freedom.

While an underage teen, she began to be raped by Epps. He whipped Patsey if she resisted his sexual demands, which left "scars of thousand stripes" on her back. His wife was jealous of her and "nothing delighted the mistress so much as to see her suffer," according to Northup. She physically abused Patsey and demanded that Epps sell Patsey, which he would not do. Mary tried to bribe other workers and slaves to kill Patsey and dump her body in the swamps, but no one would. Even though Patsey was a highly productive slave and a favorite of Epps, she endured abuse by a "licentious master and a jealous mistress".

On one occasion, she had gone to a neighboring plantation for a bar of soap. When Epps found out she had left his plantation, he had four stakes hammered into the ground and ordered her hands and feet to be tied to them, she was stripped naked and Northup was then ordered to whip her. Epps then took the whip himself until she was "literally flayed" from over 50 lashes. Salt water was then poured over her wounds. She nearly died. Northup and Patsey were severely traumatized due to all the abuse that she endured. After this brutal whipping, she lost her light-hearted manner, the sparkle in her eyes, and the ease of her laughter. She often wished that she would die. 

Northup knew Patsey for almost a decade. As he was about to leave the Epps plantation in 1853, he said that:

Northup then boarded a carriage to freedom and he never saw her again. In 1854, his book Twelve Years a Slave was published. Almost ten years after, during the American Civil War, the 110th New York Infantry Regiment came to the plantation. They met Bob, one of the enslaved men mentioned in Northup's book, which several of the soldiers had read. Patsey left the plantation in May 1863 with the Union soldiers. Her life and fate thereafter is unknown.

Popular culture
The 2013 film 12 Years a Slave was nominated for nine Academy Awards and won the Academy Award for Best Picture. With renewed interest from the film, historians continue to research in hopes of pinpointing more specifically what happened to her.

See also
List of people who disappeared

References

Bibliography

 , a complete biography of Northup
 

19th-century American slaves
American people of Guinean descent
1830s births
Year of death unknown
19th-century American people
 19th-century African-American women